Erigeron petrophilus is a species of flowering plant in the family Asteraceae known by the common names rockloving erigeron or cliff fleabane. It is native to the mountain ranges of California from Siskiyou County south as far as San Luis Obispo County and El Dorado County. It also grows in southwestern Oregon.

Erigeron petrophilus grows in forest and woodland, often, as its name suggests, in rocky habitat. It is sometimes grows on serpentine soils. This is a perennial herb growing many hairy, glandular, spreading stems from a tough, woody caudex. The narrow, oblong leaves are equal in size and spaced evenly along each stem. The inflorescence is a cluster of several flower heads, each just over a centimeter (0.5 inches) wide and lined with layers of fuzzy, glandular phyllaries. The heads contains many yellow disc florets but no ray florets. The fruit is a small achene with a pappus of bristles.

Varieties
Erigeron petrophilus var. petrophilus - Coast Ranges from Siskiyou County to Monterey County
Erigeron petrophilus var. sierrensis, the Sierra erigeron or northern Sierra daisy - northern Sierra Nevada of California from El Dorado County to Plumas County
Erigeron petrophilus var. viscidulus (A. Gray) G. L. Nesom, the Klamath rock daisy - Klamath Mountains of northwestern California + southwestern Oregon, plus Coast Ranges as far south as Sonoma County and Sierra Nevada foothills in Butte County

References

External links
Jepson Manual Treatment
United States Department of Agriculture Plants Profile
Calphotos Photo gallery, University of Calilfornia
Photo of herbarium specimen at Missouri Botanical Garden, collected in Yuba County in 1983, isotype of Erigeron petrophilus var. sierrensis

petrophilus
Flora of California
Flora of Oregon
Plants described in 1888
Flora without expected TNC conservation status